Short Trips – Volume 4 is a Big Finish Productions audiobook based on the long-running British science fiction television series Doctor Who.

After the Big Finish Short Trips books ended the range was restarted in talking book format, now read by actors with music and sound effects.

Critical reception

Doctor Who Magazine reviewer Matt Michael recommended the collection, although had "quibbles with poor sequencing" of the stories.

References

External links 
Short Trips Volume 4

Big Finish Short Trips
Doctor Who spin-offs